The Fiat Regata is an automobile produced by Italian automaker Fiat from 1983 until 1990. The Regata name was used for the sedan and station wagon versions of the Fiat Ritmo hatchback,  corresponding to the post-facelift Ritmo. The Regata was offered with a choice of three petrol and two diesel engines, although Fiat's Argentinean operations installed other engines from later Fiat models as production there continued until 1995.

Spanish builder SEAT created a similar saloon car from Ritmo underpinnings called the SEAT Málaga, but development of the two cars was carried out separately.

1983

The Regata, unveiled at the Frankfurt Motor Show in September 1983, was developed from the pre facelift Ritmo (which had been known in United Kingdom and United States markets as the Fiat Strada) and utilised almost all the mechanicals, although the wheelbase was stretched slightly.

A conventional four door three box design, it bore very little external resemblance to the original Ritmo, although it hinted strongly at the look of the facelift of 1982 for that car. In the Swedish market, the car was called "Regatta", as Regata was uncomfortably close to a derogatory term for an overbearing woman.

The Regatta designation was also used on South American markets, except Venezuela.

Both of these were SOHC engines.

After fourteen months, diesels represented about thirty percent of the Regatas produced. The Regata 100, as the top model, was well equipped and came with a "check panel", an early onboard computer that provided information on fuel consumption, average speed, range, optimal gear selection, etcetera.

An economy model called the "ES" ("Energy Saving") was also available, it featured an early start-stop system.

Aside from the lowest priced versions, a five speed manual transmission came as standard on the Regata.

The Regata Weekend estate was introduced in November 1984. It was available with all engines offered in the sedan, although there was no optional automatic transmission available in the Regata Weekend. The Weekend replaced the 131 Panorama, which had been kept in production alongside the Regata. The Weekend featured a folding rear bumper, enabling easier access to the load area and doubling as a seat capable of supporting  when folded down.

The suspension and brakes were uprated to cope with the extra weight. Alongside there was also a two-seater glazed van derivative called the Marengo, only available with the larger diesel engine. The Marengo made its debut at the Brussels Commercial vehicle show in the beginning of 1985.

1986

A mid-life update was carried out in April 1986, in which numerous small details were changed, most notably new doors with an altered window line. New door handles, grille, bumpers and wheel trims also featured.

The 1,585 cc engine gained fuel injection to become the 100S i.e. (also available with a catalytic converter, losing some power and becoming the 90 i.e.) whilst a catalysed and fuel injected 1,498 cc unit powered the 75 i.e.

The diesel powered models also changed slightly. An  1,929 cc turbodiesel engine was introduced, badged Regata Turbo DS. This model was simply badged as the Regata D. The weight was also reduced slightly. Production ceased in February 1990, when the Tempra was introduced.

Sevel production
 The Regata started production by Sevel in Argentina in 1985, where production continued until 1995. 56,789 were built in Argentina, with limited exports to select South American nations with lower barriers for entry such as Venezuela and Chile. As in Sweden, the car was called the Regatta in Latin America. Unlike its European sisters, the car was considered somewhat upmarket in Latin America.

The Regatta 85 received an  1.5 litre, while a 100S came with a  1.6 litre version. The 85 was available in either base or "full" versions. Along with a light facelift in November 1987, the 2000 Twincam replaced the 100S, carrying the same level of equipment but with the Croma's larger Twin Cam two-litre engine with 10 more horsepower and considerably more torque. The Regatta 85 changed names, becoming the Regatta 1.5 S (Super) and SC (Super Confort, corresponding to the earlier full version).

The new 2000 managed the 0–100 km/h sprint in 9.8 seconds and had a rear spoiler. Top speed was claimed to be .

A more thorough facelift in 1988 produced the Regatta Edición II. The engines remained the same until the 1990 model year, when both engines were replaced by the  1581 cc engine from the Fiat Tipo.

Production ended in 1995, as the Regata was replaced by the Tempra in Latin America as well. The Regatta Weekend (Station Wagon) was also produced in Argentina between 1986 and 1992, initially only available with the 1.5 engine. For the last three years, this was replaced with the Tipo's 1.6 litre engine.

Engines

Petrol

Diesel

Scale models
Polistil manufactured a 1/25 and a 1/41 scale diecast Regata. A 1/43 variant of this car was made by Bburago, Norev (for Hachette Fiat Story) and Elite Models.

References

Regata
Compact cars
Front-wheel-drive vehicles
Sedans
Station wagons
1990s cars
Cars of Argentina
Cars introduced in 1983
Cars discontinued in 1995